John Cutts may refer to:

 Sir John Cutts (died 1615), English MP
 Sir John Cutts (died 1646), English MP, son of above
 John Cutts, 1st Baron Cutts (1661–1707), British soldier and author
 John Cutts (jockey) (c. 1829 – 1872), Australian jockey
 Sir John Cutts, 1st Baronet (c. 1634 – 1670), of the Cutts baronets
 John Edward Knight Cutts (1847–1938), English ecclesiastical architect

See also
Cutts (disambiguation)